Louis Fursy Henri Compère (16 January 1768 – 27 March 1833) was a French general of artillery in the French Revolutionary Wars and the Napoleonic Wars.

Compère was born in Péronne, Somme.  In 1794, he was promoted to chef de brigade, the equivalent of colonel. On 1 May 1794, he was promoted to general of brigade. He was part of the Army of the Danube crossing into the southwest German states in 1799, and participated in the Battle of Ostrach and the Battle of Stockach. 
He was the brother of the General Claude Antoine Compère (1774–1812).

Career
He fought at the Battle of Verona on 18 October 1805 where his brigade of Gaspard Amédée Gardanne's division supported the initial attack of André Masséna's converged voltiguers. Later his soldiers formed squares to drive off a counterattack by Austrian hussars. He also led his troops at the Battle of Caldiero on 29 to 31 October in the same year. He commanded one of Jean Reynier's brigades at the Battle of Maida on 4 July 1806. He personally led the 1st Light Infantry Regiment in an attack against the British. Hit by a bullet, he continued to urge his troops forward. Showing incredible bravery, he rode literally among the enemy infantry where he was finally captured. He was promoted to general of division on 1 March 1807. Napoleon awarded him the Commander's Cross of the Legion of Honor.

Notes

References
 Schneid, Frederick C. Napoleon's Italian Campaigns: 1805-1815. Westport, Conn.: Praeger Publishers, 2002. 
 Smith, Digby. The Napoleonic Wars Data Book. London: Greenhill Books, 1998. 

1786 births
1833 deaths
People from Somme (department)
Generals of the First French Empire
French Republican military leaders of the French Revolutionary Wars